Caloptilia mastopis is a moth of the family Gracillariidae. It is known from the states of Assam, Meghalaya and Maharashtra in India.

The larvae feed on Litsea stocksii. They mine the leaves of their host plant. The mine has the form of a narrow elongate blotch at the edge of a young leaf. It is found on the underside of the leaf.

References

mastopis
Moths of Asia
Moths described in 1918